Flaherty, an unincorporated community in Meade County, Kentucky, United States, is located 13 miles/21 km south of Brandenburg on KY 144, at its intersection with KY 1600 and KY 1816. While predominantly a rural agricultural community; Flaherty has a modest business district consisting of a Dollar General store, car wash, banks, and a gas station. Notable locations also include: Flaherty Elementary & Primary School, Saint Martin of Tours Catholic Church, Flaherty Ball Park, and Flaherty Fire Department. Clarkson House is also in Flaherty.

References

External links
KY HomeTownLocator - Flaherty
City-data.com - Flaherty, Kentucky

Unincorporated communities in Meade County, Kentucky
Louisville metropolitan area
Unincorporated communities in Kentucky